Braeval distillery is a distiller of Scotch whisky in Chapeltown, Banffshire, Scotland. Founded in 1973 as Braes of Glenlivet, the distillery is owned by Chivas Brothers. The name was changed to avoid confusion with an unrelated single malt.

References

1973 establishments in Scotland
Companies based in Aberdeenshire
Scottish malt whisky
Distilleries in Scotland